Roman Shevliakov (born 26 August 1998) is a Russian swimmer. He competed in the men's 50 metre butterfly event at the 2018 FINA World Swimming Championships (25 m), in Hangzhou, China.

References

External links

1998 births
Living people
Russian male swimmers
Male butterfly swimmers
Place of birth missing (living people)
Swimmers at the 2015 European Games
European Games gold medalists for Russia
European Games medalists in swimming
Medalists at the FINA World Swimming Championships (25 m)